Rao Ganga or  Rav Gango Vaghavat (6 May 1484 – 9 May 1532) was an Indian king from the Rathore dynasty who ruled the traditional Rathore realm of Maruwara (Marwar) in the present-day state of Rajasthan. Ganga ascended to the throne in 1515 through the support from his family nobles. During his reign, the Rathores consolidated and expanded their rule in Marwar.

He retained positive relations with his neighbours, most notably with the powerful monarch Rana Sanga whom he aided in his various campaigns. Ganga sent a contingent of Rathore troops under the command of Prince Maldeo, in the historic Battle of Khanwa against the Mughal invader Babur, who later rescued the fainted Sanga from the battlefield. Afterwards, Ganga annexed territories from the Afghans and his own relatives, before being murdered by Maldeo, who succeeded him in 1531 CE and under whom Rathore kingdom reached zeninth of its glory.

Reign
Ganga or Gango was born on 6 May 1484, the son of Vagho Sujavat and Kumvrani Cahuvan Udanbal. Despite being a younger son of the king, Rao Suja, Vagho Sujavat was the chosen successor, but died before his father. Ganga rose to the throne on 8 November 1515 as his older brother Rao Viramde was considered unfit to rule and was unable to gain the support of the Rathore nobility. Ganga set up his palace in Jodhpur. However, Viramde was unwilling to remain subordinate, laying the foundation for future conflicts between Sojhat and Jodhpur.

At the time of Ganga's accession, the Delhi Sultanate was on a rapid decline under its unpopular ruler Ibrahim Lodhi, which allowed Ganga to expand the frontiers of his own kingdom. During his reign, the Sisodia king Rana Sanga (c.1508–1528) embarked a period of territorial expansion of Mewar after defeating various Sultanates in pitched battles, including the Lodhis. Taking the opportunity, Ganga made friendly relations with Mewar, enhancing the alliance further by marrying one of his sister Dhansi to Sanga.

At various occasions, Ganga sent contingents of Rathore soldiers in aid of his brother-in law's military campaigns and himself in person assisted him against Muzaffar Shah of Gujarat in reinstating Raimal on the throne of Idar. Ganga send a strong army of 4,000 under Prince Maldeo who led the left contingent of the Rajput army in Battle of Khanwa on 17 March 1527. When Sanga was wounded and fainted in the battle, he was removed from the battlefield in an unconscious state by Prince Maldev aided by Prithviraj Kachwaha of Dhundar.

After the triumph in Khanwa, Babur did not penetrate into Rajasthan and the subsequent decline of Mewar after the assassination of Sanga allowed Ganga to expand his kingdom and laid the base for a powerful Rathore kingdom.  On 2 November 1529, in the Battle of Sevaki, Ganga confronted the forces of Sojat, who had gained the support of Daualt Khan and Sarkhel Khan. He won the battle, with the Sojat leader Sekho Sujavat dead, both Daualt Khan and Sarkhel Khan fleeing the scene. Afterwards, Ganga faced an invasion of Afghans from Nagore under the command of Daualt Khan. In a pitched battle aided by Rathore branch of Bikaner, Ganga defeated the Afghans and killed Sarkhel Khan in the battle.

Death
Ganga died on 21 May 1531. According to the historian Muhnot Nainsi in his work Nainsi ri khyat, he was murdered by his ambitious son Maldeo who pushed him from the balcony. Later writers assert that Ganga's fall was an accidental one due to opium, without giving any conclusive evidence to save Maldeo from charge of patricide. It was under the rule of Maldeo that the Rathore house reached its pinnacle of glory in political importance and territorial expansion.

Issue
Rao Ganga had 6 sons:
 Maldeo, who succeeded his father.
 Vairsal
 Man Singh
 Kishan Singh
 Sadul 
 Kanh

He had 3 daughters:
 Sonbai, who married Bhati Raval Lunkaran Jaitslyot of Jaisajmer (1528–1551)
 Rajkumvar, who married Sisodiyo Gahlot Rano Vikramaditya Sarigavat of Citor (c. 1531–1536) 
 Campabai, who married Devro Cahuvan Rav Raysingh Akhairajot of Sirohi

References

Bibliography

 
 
 
 
 
 

1484 births
1532 deaths
16th-century Indian monarchs
Monarchs of Marwar
16th-century murdered monarchs